Shafin Ahmed (born 14 February 1969) is a Bangladeshi rock bassist, singer-songwriter, record producer and politician. He was the lead singer, songwriter and bassist for the Bangladeshi rock band Miles, where he and his elder brother Hamin Ahmed joined in 1979 and have led the band.

Born in the city of Kolkata, Ahmed is the youngest son of Bangladeshi classical music singer Kamal Dasgupta and Bangladeshi singer Firoza Begum. Their family was traditionally a  musical family. He started his musical career at the age of 9. They moved to Dhaka in the late 60s. He was exposed to rock and roll music in the late 70s, when he went to London for higher education. He joined Miles in 1979, first as an acoustic guitarist, and later lead singer and bassist in 1991 when many of the past members had left and Miles reestablished themselves in the 90s Bangla rock music scene.

Early life 
Ahmed was born in Kolkata, India on 14 February. He was the youngest son of famous musicians Kamal Dasgupta and Feroza Begum. They later moved to Dhaka. He began his musical career at the age of 9 by taking lessons about Nazrul Sangeet. He was exposed to western musical influences since he studied in England, along with his elder brother, Hamin Ahmed. They then joined the Band Miles which went on to become a leading musical group in Bangladesh.

Career

Miles (1979–2021) 
Ahmed joined the pioneering rock band Miles in 1979 as acoustic guitarist along with his brother Hamin and later became the lead singer and bassist. He has appeared in all of the albums of Miles and has written and composed many of their top hits. In 2009, he left Miles for problems with the other members for the ownership of Miles. But, in 2013 he returned to the band and appeared on the ninth album প্রতিচ্ছবি (Reflections). He left Miles again in 2017 after having trouble with the members again but came back in late 2018 after resolving their issues. He announced in 2021 that he will be leaving the band for the third and final time.

Rhythm of Life (2010–2014) 
On 12 January 2010, Ahmed left Miles citing personal differences with the band. He formed a new band group – Rhythm of Life. The other members who joined were – Wasiun (guitar), Shahin (guitar), Sumon (keyboard), Shams (bass guitar), Ujjal (percussion), and Rumi (drums). But Ahmed disbanded the new group and returned to Miles at the end of the year.

Discography

Solo 
 তোমাকেই (Only You) (1997)
 পাগলা ঘন্টি (Mad Bell) (1998)
 ছবি আর স্মৃতি (Images and the Memories) (1999)
 Best of Shafin Ahmed (2001)
 কতদিন দেখিনা তোমায় (Didn't See You For Many Days) (2006)
 Virus (2006)
 হারানো সুখ (Lost Happiness) (2007)
 My Love Songs (2010)

Singles
 L.E.G.E.N.D  (2017)
 Oshomomapto (2020)
 Dukhi Nogori (2020)

Band (Miles) 

 "আরও এক ধাপ (A Step Further) (1986)
 "প্রতিশ্রুতি (Promise)" (1991)
 "প্রত্যাশা (Expectation)" (1993)
 "প্রত্যয় (Belief)" (1996)
 "প্রয়াস (Attempt). (1997)
 "প্রবাহ (Flow)" (2000)
 "প্রতিধ্বনি (Echoes)" (2006)
 "প্রতিচ্ছবি (Reflections)" (2015)
Extended Play
 "প্রবর্তন (Induction)" (2016)

Compilation albums
 Best of Miles (মাইলসের সেরা) (1994)
 প্রিয়তমা (Darling) (?)
 ফিরিয়ে দাও (Give [it] Back) (?)

Film scores 
 Warning (2015)

References 

Living people
21st-century Bangladeshi male singers
21st-century Bangladeshi singers
1961 births
20th-century Bangladeshi male singers
20th-century Bangladeshi singers
Musicians from West Bengal